Kshetram is a 2011 Telugu-language, fantasy film, produced by G. Govinda Raju on Sri Balaji Movie Makers banner and directed by T Venu Gopal. Starring Jagapati Babu, Priyamani, and Shaam with music composed by Koti. The film is a heroine-centric film and Jagapathi Babu and Shaam play Priyamani's love interests.

Plot
The film opens with the history of a village called Kshetram. An idol of Lakshmi Narasimha Swamy from the temple is hidden in a forest to save it from invaders. Generations of the Rayulu family have struggled to reinstate the idol in the temple but were unable to do so. After a few generations, Veera Narasimharayalu a powerful village leader of the same dynasty wants to finish the ancient ritual, which is critical, to the well-being of his village. Veera Narasimharayalu changes his name to Naga Penchalayya being the process of the ritual, but he has been killed by his uncle, Chinnanna, and his cousin brother Viswanadha Rayulu to conquer his position and property. The ritual remains incomplete so his wife Lakshmi decides to continue the process, and change herself to Naga Penchalamma to complete the ritual as her husband's last wish. Naga Penchalamma and her entire family were also killed by some baddies. Before dying, she takes an oath that in any circumstances she will come back to succeed in the mission. After 25 years Chakri is the son of Viswanadha Rayulu falls in love with Sohini Agrawal, who is eerily similar to Lakshmi. When Sohini comes into the ancestral house of Chakri, strange supernatural events happen and powerful spirits and souls come into the picture. What happens to Sohini? Will the ritual be completed?

Cast

 Jagapati Babu as Veera Narasimha Rayalu (Naga Penchalaiah)
 Shaam as Chakradeva "Chakri" Rayalu
 Priyamani as Lakshmi (Naga Penchalamma) and Sohini Agarwal
 Kota Srinivasa Rao as Chinnanna
 Adithya Menon as Viswanadha Rayulu
 Tanikella Bharani as the priest
 Brahmaji as an SP
 Brahmanandam
 Chalapathi Rao
 Posani Krishna Murali
 Vijayaranga Raju
 Rajiv Kanakala
 Jakkie
 Uttej
 Annapurna
 Siva Parvati
 Prabhakar
 Jayalalitha
 Hema
 Surekha Vani
 Manju Bhargavi
 Tarzan
 Meena
 Alpathi Lakshmi

Production 
Shooting for the film was halted after the Telugu film industry went on a strike due to the differing demands between the producers, employees, and actors. The film is female-oriented.

Soundtrack

Music composed by Koti. Lyrics written by Suddala Ashok Teja. Music released on ADITYA Music Company.

Release 
A critic from Rediff gave the film a rating of one out of five stars and stated that "Director T Venuogopal takes up the theme in Kshetram but fails miserably. The treatment is shabby and production values are poor". A critic from 123Telugu wrote that "Kshetram is a bad khichdi of Arundhati and Chandramukhi". A critic from Full Hyderabad gave a negative review.

References

External links 

2011 films
2010s Telugu-language films
Indian fantasy films
2011 fantasy films
Films scored by Koti
Indian films with live action and animation